Duncan Stewart (1930–1996) was a British academic administrator, and the principal of Lady Margaret Hall, Oxford, from 1979 to 1995.

References

1930 births
1996 deaths
Principals of Lady Margaret Hall, Oxford